Fourteen regional health authorities were established in England by the National Health Service Reorganisation Act 1973 in 1974, replacing the English regional hospital boards. This reorganisation was planned by the Conservative government of Edward Heath, but survived the General Election 1974. The new Labour government published a paper on Democracy in the NHS in May 1974 that added local government representatives to the new RHAs and increased their proportion on each area health authority to a third.

They were responsible for strategy, the building programme, staffing matters and the allocation of resources to their 90 subordinate area health authorities.

In 1996 the fourteen regional health authorities were abolished by the Health Authorities Act 1995 and replaced by eight regional offices of the NHS Executive.  They were then abolished in their turn by the Health and Social Care Act 2012.  But the delegation of authority to DevoManc was hailed by the editor of the British Medical Journal as a possible regeneration of RHAs.

See also 
 List of NHS regional health authorities (before 1996)

References

Defunct National Health Service organisations